Louisiana's 25th State Senate district is one of 39 districts in the Louisiana State Senate. It has been represented by Republican Mark Abraham since 2020.

Geography
District 25 covers all of Cameron and Jefferson Davis Parishes and parts of Acadia and Calcasieu Parishes in Louisiana's far southeastern corner, including some or all of Crowley, Jennings, Welsh, Lake Arthur, Iowa, and Hackberry.

The district is located entirely within Louisiana's 3rd congressional district, and overlaps with the 34th, 36th, 37th, 41st, 42nd, and 47th districts of the Louisiana House of Representatives.

Recent election results
Louisiana uses a jungle primary system. If no candidate receives 50% in the first round of voting, when all candidates appear on the same ballot regardless of party, the top-two finishers advance to a runoff election.

2019

2015

2011

Federal and statewide results in District 25

References

Louisiana State Senate districts
Acadia Parish, Louisiana
Calcasieu Parish, Louisiana
Cameron Parish, Louisiana
Jefferson Davis Parish, Louisiana